Vice Admiral Naveed Ashraf  is a Vice admiral and a flag officer in the Pakistan Navy who is currently serving as Deputy Chief of the Naval Staff, (Training and Personnel), DCNS-T&P at Naval Headquarters in Islamabad. He took the office as Head of Trainning and Personnel branch of the Pakistan Navy. He has also previously served as commandant Naval Academy, Vice President of the National Defence University, Naval Secretary, and Deputy Chief of the Naval staff at the Naval Headquarters for administration branch.

Career 
He graduated from the Pakistan Naval War College, the National Defence University and the Naval War College, US. He obtained his military education from the Royal College of Defence.

Ashraf was commissioned in the Pakistan Navy with his first appointment in 1989 at the operations branch. His command assignments includes 18th and 25th Destroyer Squadron, in addition to serving as commandant Pakistan Naval Academy. At staff, he was appointed as chief staff officer for Combined Task Force 150 at the United States Naval Forces Central Command, chief instructor of the National Defence University, and captain training at the Flag Officer Sea Training (FOST).

Awards and decorations

Dates Of Rank

References 

Living people
Pakistan Navy officers
Graduates of the Royal College of Defence Studies
National Defence University, Pakistan alumni
Academic staff of Pakistan Military Academy
Pakistan Naval War College alumni
Naval War College alumni
Recipients of Tamgha-e-Basalat
Recipients of Hilal-i-Imtiaz
Year of birth missing (living people)
Place of birth missing (living people)